Life is the fourth full studio album by Angela Aki released on September 8, 2010.

Singles
 Ai no Kisetsu (愛の季節; Seasons of Love) is the first single from the album. Released on September 16, 2009, it was used as a theme song for NHK drama "Tsubasa".
 Kagayaku Hito (輝く人; Shining One) is the second single, released on April 10, 2010. For the first time Aki plays the guitar in a song. he title track was used as a theme song for NHK drama "Kokoro no Idenshi".

Other Songs
 Life was used as the CM for Nissay campaign "Mihai Support".
 Every Woman's song was released to promote the album. It reached the second position on the USEN J-Pop Chart; it's the first song with English lyrics to make it into the top three.

Track listing

Charts

Release history

References

External links
 Official Site
 Sony Music Profile: Regular // Limited
 Oricon Profile: Regular // Limited

2010 albums
Angela Aki albums
Sony Music Entertainment Japan albums